The Thomas Jones House, at 635 N. 400 West in Beaver, Utah, was built in 1873.  It was listed on the National Register of Historic Places in 1982.

It is a black rock (basalt) hall and parlor plan house built by Scotland-born stonemason Thomas Frazer.

References

		
National Register of Historic Places in Beaver County, Utah
Houses completed in 1873